Fabian Piasecki (born 4 May 1995) is a Polish professional footballer who plays as a forward for Raków Częstochowa.

Honours
Individual
Ekstraklasa Goal of the Season: 2021–22

References

External links

Polish footballers
1995 births
Living people
Poland youth international footballers
Rozwój Katowice players
Górnik Zabrze players
Olimpia Zambrów players
Miedź Legnica players
Zagłębie Sosnowiec players
Śląsk Wrocław players
Stal Mielec players
Raków Częstochowa players
Ekstraklasa players
I liga players
II liga players
Association football forwards
Sportspeople from Wrocław